Faculty Lounge is a band based in Des Moines, Iowa, created during Halloween of 2000 by bassist Dave Maxwell, guitarist Timm Pilcher, and drummer Mark Stallman. The band is made up of nine players, all of whom are either current or former teachers, coaches, and/or administrators in the  Des Moines Public School system or surrounding area.

The band has performed three times for President Barack Obama and several times for former Iowa Governor Chet Culver (a former teacher at Des Moines Hoover and Roosevelt High Schools) who proclaimed the band as, "The First Band of Iowa."

The band holds a strong presence in the Des Moines area, playing numerous concerts throughout the year in front of thousands of fans at events such as Ingersoll LIVE!, Beaverdale Fall Fest, the Windsor Heights Fourth of July Festival, and Altoona Palooza. The band is also known for its charitable efforts, donating its time and talents to fundraisers benefiting causes such as JDRF and Best Buddies International. Members of the band are active in other musical projects and are often in demand as special guest performers with other local bands.

Lineup 

Dana Andrews, Instructor, DMPS
Anna Lee, Instructor, WDM public schools
Dave Maxwell, Administrator, WDM public schools
Timm Pilcher, Instructor, DMPS
Aaron Smith, Instructor, DMPS
Mark Stallman, Administrator, Waukee public schools
Kelli Stoa, Instructor, Johnston public schools
Joanne Tubbs, Administrator, IA BOEE
Ryan Williamson, Administrator, DMPS

The band is supported by sound technician Shawn Mc Farland.

References 

American funk musical groups
Musical groups established in 2000
Musical groups from Des Moines, Iowa